Porvenir is a district of the Nandayure canton, in the Guanacaste province of Costa Rica. Located on the Nicoya Peninsula.

Geography 
Porvenir has an area of  km² and an elevation of  metres.

Villages
The administrative center of the district is the village of Cerro Azul.

Other villages in the district are Ángeles, Bellavista, Cabeceras de Río Bejuco, Chompipe (partly), Delicias, Quebrada Grande and San Josecito.

Demographics 

For the 2011 census, Porvenir had a population of  inhabitants.

Transportation

Road transportation 
The district is covered by the following road routes:
 National Route 903

References 

Districts of Guanacaste Province
Populated places in Guanacaste Province